The .32 Long Colt (commonly called the .32 LC or simply  .32 Colt) is an American centerfire revolver cartridge.

Description
Introduced by Colt's with the New Line revolver in 1873, the .32 Colt was inspired by the .320 Revolver. It originally used a .313 in (7.95 mm)-diameter 90 gr (5.8 g) outside-lubricated heeled bullet, which was later changed to inside lubrication, leading to a diameter change to .299 in (7.59 mm), a slight reduction in bullet weight, and a shortening of overall length.

With a case lengthened by .31 in (7.87 mm) over the .32 Short Colt (which means the .32 SC will chamber and fire in any weapon designed for the LC), the .32LC is in the same class in power as the .32 Smith & Wesson Long, without comparable accuracy. The .32 Long Colt and .32 S&W Long are not interchangeable due to differences in case and bullet diameter.

More popular in Europe than North America, Colt was the most prominent American manufacturer which chambered any weapons in .32 Long Colt, most notably the Police Positive. The FAMAE revolver produced in Chile is currently offered in .32 Long Colt.

See also
.32 Rimfire
8mm caliber
List of cartridges by caliber

References

Notes
Barnes, Frank C., ed. by John T. Amber. ".32 Long Colt—.32 Short Colt" & ".320 Revolver", in Cartridges of the World, pp. 155 & 177. Northfield, IL: DBI Books, 1972. .

Colt cartridges
Pistol and rifle cartridges
Weapons and ammunition introduced in 1873